Căzănești may refer to several places in Romania:

Căzănești, a town in Ialomița County
Căzănești, Mehedinți, a commune in Mehedinți County
Căzănești, a village in Vața de Jos Commune, Hunedoara County
Căzănești, a village in Verguleasa Commune, Olt County
Căzănești, a village in Ghioroiu Commune, Vâlcea County
Căzănești, a village in Milcoiu Commune, Vâlcea County
Căzănești, a village in Râmnicu Vâlcea city, Vâlcea County
Căzănești, a village in Negrești town, Vaslui County

and in Moldova:

Căzănești, Telenești, a commune in Telenești District